Mushahary is a Boro surname. Notable people with the surname include:
Banendra Mushahary, Indian politician
Rajendra Mushahary, Indian politician
Bhaskar Mushahary, Indian civil servant, IAS 1980 Batch
Ruprekha Mushahary, entrepreneur, social worker, poet, writer, blogger and expert in Assamese and Bodo cuisine 
Sonali Mushahary, media person

Surnames of Indian origin